Born to Boogie is a 1972 British concert film about a concert at the Empire Pool starring T. Rex, Marc Bolan, Ringo Starr and Elton John. Directed by Starr himself, the movie was released on The Beatles' Apple Films label.

Content 

Born to Boogie consists of concert footage, of two shows  of the band at the Empire Pool, Wembley, London in March 1972. Next to this features excerpts of studio scenes with jams of Bolan with Ringo Starr on drums and Elton John on piano, filmed at the Apple Studios in Savile Row, London; and various vignettes reminiscent of The Beatles' Magical Mystery Tour, shot at Denham and Tittenhurst Park, Sunninghill. The Tea Party sequence was filmed at John Lennon's estate in the same spots as Lennon's "Imagine" video was filmed.

Release 

The UK premiere was held at Oscar's Cinema in Brewer Street, Soho on 14 December 1972, attended by T. Rex, Ringo Starr and Elton John.

The film was released on DVD in 2005 including the two London concerts in full plus footage presented by Bolan's son, Rolan Bolan. There is no appearance on the extra material from director Ringo Starr.

The cover and DVD animations were designed and produced by Bose Collins.

References

External links

Sources

 

1972 films
British musical films
1970s musical films
Concert films
Apple Films films
British rock music films
Ringo Starr
1970s English-language films
Elton John
1970s British films